Memsie Cairn is an ancient cairn in Memsie, near Fraserburgh, Aberdeenshire, Scotland.

Historic Scotland believe the burial cairn to be from the Bronze Age. It is an ancient historic monument managed by Historic Scotland.

References

Bronze Age sites in Scotland
Historic Scotland properties in Aberdeenshire
Scheduled monuments in Scotland